William Humphrey may refer to:

William Humphrey (engraver) (1740–1810), English printseller
William Humphrey (cricketer) (1843–1918), English cricketer
William Humphrey (writer) (1924–1997), American novelist
William Humphrey (Northern Ireland politician) (born 1967), Northern Irish unionist
William E. Humphrey (1862–1934), American politician
William F. Humphrey (1860–1928), Canadian politician in the Legislative Assembly of New Brunswick
William J. Humphrey (1875–1942), film director
Willie Humphrey (1900–1994), jazz clarinetist
William Humfrey (died 1579), mining promoter, Assay Master at the Royal Mint

See also
William Humphreys (disambiguation)